Ballard is a townland in County Westmeath, Ireland.

Ballard is one of 8 townlands of the civil parish of Portloman in the barony of Corkaree in the Province of Leinster. The neighbouring townlands are: Portloman to the north, Tullaghan to the east and south, Walshestown North to the south, Ballyboy to the west and Lugnagullagh and Scurlockstown to the north–west. The north–eastern boundary of the townland is formed by the shoreline of Lough Owel and the small island of Browns or Grania's Island.

In the 1911 census of Ireland there were 5 houses and 23 inhabitants in the townland.

References

External links
Map of Ballard at openstreetmap.org
Ballard at The IreAtlas Townland Data Base
Ballard at Townlands.ie
Ballard at the Placenames Database of Ireland

Townlands of County Westmeath